The Hotel Haegumgang is a floating hotel that began operations in Queensland, Australia, was moved to Vietnam, and is currently docked at Mount Kumgang on the east coast of North Korea. According to the Australian Broadcasting Corporation, it "has developed something of a cult following in Australia".

History

Australia
The hotel was the brainchild of Australian developer Doug Tarca and his son Peter. The design was by Swedish engineer Sten Sjöstrand, who later became a renowned maritime archaeologist in the South China Sea.
It was constructed in Singapore and opened in 1988 as the John Brewer Floating Hotel. It was positioned on the John Brewer Reef, in the Great Barrier Reef off the coast of Townsville, Queensland, Australia. The seven-storey structure had nearly 200 rooms, nightclub, bars, restaurants, a helipad, and a tennis court. However, the hotel soon began to struggle financially. The hotel operated as the Four Seasons Barrier Reef Resort.

Vietnam
The hotel was relocated to Ho Chi Minh City, Vietnam in 1989, operating as the Saigon Floating Hotel. It was moored in the Saigon River, near the Tran Hung Dao Statue, from 1989 to 1997. Colloquially known as "The Floater", it was a popular nightspot, but again ran into financial difficulties.

North Korea 
The hotel was bought by Hyundai Asan and taken to the Mount Kumgang Tourist Region which opened in 1998 on the border between North and South Korea. Tours to the resort were suspended in 2008 after a South Korean woman left the Mount Kumgang tourist area and entered a North Korean military zone. She was shot and killed by a North Korean soldier. 

In 2018, North Korean leader Kim Jong-un and South Korean President Moon Jae-in agreed to reopen the resort.

In October 2019, it was reported that Kim Jong-un had visited the site and criticised the facilities, being quoted as saying that "they are not only very backward in terms of architecture but look so shabby as they are not properly cared for. The buildings are just a hotchpotch with no national character at all." He went on to say that the "unpleasant-looking facilities" should be removed and rebuilt to "meet [North Korea's] own sentiment and aesthetic taste".  In January 2020, the North Korean government said that redevelopment of the site was postponed due to the coronavirus pandemic. In March 2022, it was reported that the dismantling of the hotel had commenced. In April 2022, Hyundai Asan and the South Korean Unification Ministry spoke out against North Korea's unilateral dismantling of the hotel.

References 

Hotels in North Korea
Floating structures
Buildings and structures in Kangwon Province
Hotels established in 1988